Ang Iibigin ay Ikaw (International title: My One and Only Love / ) is a Philippine television drama romance series broadcast by GMA Network. Directed by Joyce Bernal and Lore Reyes, it stars Christopher de Leon, Alice Dixson and Richard Gomez. It premiered on July 15, 2002. The series concluded on April 11, 2003 with a total of 200 episodes. It was replaced by Ang Iibigin ay Ikaw Pa Rin in its timeslot.

Cast and characters

Lead cast
 Richard Gomez as Waldo Sandoval
 Alice Dixson as Mia Sandoval
 Christopher de Leon as Lemuel Verder

Supporting cast
 Lani Mercado as Madonna Verder
 Barbara Perez as Salud Verder
 Boots Anson-Roa as Feliza
 Jackie Lou Blanco as Sabrina Villadolid
 Rio Locsin as Cita Almendraz
 Mark Gil as Enrico Villadolid
 Rosa Rosal as Lucing
 Bembol Roco as Oscar
 Rufa Mae Quinto as Liberty "Libay"
 Karen delos Reyes as Elmina Sandoval
 Chubi del Rosario as Anthony Verder
 Polo Ravales as Tristan Villadolid
 Krista Ranillo as Scarlet

Guest cast
 Anne Curtis as Rosanna Luarca
 Angel Locsin as Mariella Sandoval
 Johnny Revilla as Rodolfo Luarca
 AJ Eigenmann as Marcel Almendras
 Rey Emmanuel de Guzman as Daniel
 Valerie Concepcion as Lilian Almendras
 Mely Tagasa as Miling
 Lady Lee as Anna
 Ross Berenguel as Ivan
 Tommy Abuel as Atty. Cruz
 Anthony Roquel as Papu
 Armando Goyena as Donato Verder
 Cris Daluz as Roberto
 Empress Schuck as young Elmina
 Brian Homecillo as young Marcel
 Louise delos Reyes as young Stella
 Vangie Labalan as Yolanda Lujan
 Champagne Morales as Stella
 Aiza Marquez as Yasmin

References

External links
 

2002 Philippine television series debuts
2003 Philippine television series endings
Filipino-language television shows
GMA Network drama series
Philippine romance television series
Television shows set in the Philippines